The Cherry House is a historic house at 217 Dooley Road in North Little Rock, Arkansas.  It is a -story wood-frame structure, finished with a painted brick veneer.  The main block has single-story flanking wings, which join it to a two-story wing on the left and a garage on the right.  The main entrance is sheltered by a Georgian Revival-style semicircular portico.  Built in 1930, it has been asserted to be the finest example of Colonial Revival architecture in the city's Edgemont neighborhood.

The house was listed on the National Register of Historic Places in 1992.

See also
Cherry-Luter Estate, North Little Rock, Arkansas, also NRHP-listed
National Register of Historic Places listings in Pulaski County, Arkansas

References

Houses on the National Register of Historic Places in Arkansas
Colonial Revival architecture in Arkansas
Houses completed in 1930
Houses in North Little Rock, Arkansas
National Register of Historic Places in Pulaski County, Arkansas